Heraldo de Aragón is a Spanish language regional daily newspaper published in Saragossa, Spain. The paper has been in circulation since 1895.

History and profile
Heraldo de Aragón was first published on 20 September 1895. The owner is Heraldo de Aragón, S.A. which also owns Heraldo de Soria, and Que! Aragón. The publisher of the daily is KBA Comet press. The paper is based in Saragossa and serves the provinces of Huesca, Saragossa, and Teruel.

Heraldo de Aragón has a conservative political stance. It is published in broadsheet format. The paper was awarded the European Newspaper of the Year award for 2003 in the category of regional newspapers.

As of 2013 Heraldo de Aragón had a science supplement, Tercer Milenio, which was published weekly on Tuesdays since 1993.

Circulation
Heraldo de Aragón has the highest circulation and is the most significant paper in its distribution area. In 1993 the paper sold 58,401 copies. In 2008 the paper had a circulation of 53,087 copies. It was 48,615 copies in the period of 2009-2010. The circulation of the paper was 44,000 copies in 2011.

References

External links

1895 establishments in Spain
Daily newspapers published in Spain
Mass media in Zaragoza
Newspapers published in Aragon
Publications established in 1895
Spanish-language newspapers
Spanish news websites
Conservatism in Spain